Lavkino is a rural locality (a village) in Sosnovskoye Rural Settlement, Vologodsky District, Vologda Oblast, Russia. The population was 7 as of 2002. There is 1 street.

Geography 
Lavkino is located 22 km west of Vologda (the district's administrative centre) by road. Sosnovka is the nearest rural locality.

References 

Rural localities in Vologodsky District